Poul-Erik Nielsen (10 April 1931 – 14 January 2023) was a Danish badminton player. He was a doubles specialist winning three All England titles with partners Erland Kops, Finn Kobberø and Inge Birgit Hansen and reached five more finals. He has four National titles to his name and was capped 33 times by Denmark from 1954 to 1964. He was the elder brother of Knud Aage Nielsen another notable badminton player.

Achievements

International tournaments 

Men's doubles

Medal Record at the All England Badminton Championships

References

1932 births
2023 deaths
Danish male badminton players
Badminton executives and administrators